Open joint-stock company (JSC) NMZ or Nizhny Novgorod Machine-building Plant is a Russian (formerly Soviet) artillery factory in the Sormovo district of Gorky. It included the TsAKB artillery design bureau led by Vasiliy Grabin.

Currently, part of Almaz-Antey together with Almaz-Antey Branch no. 1.

Names
Previous names for this factory include Gorky Machine-building Plant, All-Union Machine-building Plant New Sormovo (Novoje Sormovo), Joseph Stalin Factory No. 92, Artillery Factory No. 92, Zavod imeni Stalina, or ZiS.

Products
Its products included:
 ZiS-2 57mm antitank gun
 ZiS-3 76.2mm divisional gun
 ZiS-5 76.2mm tank gun (version of the F-34 tank gun)
 ZiS-30 self-propelled antitank gun
 ZiS-S-53 85mm tank gun

Current products 
 Ship-based nuclear power plant for Navy (including surface ships and submarine)
 In 2006 Rosenergoatom and Sevmash signed a contract for the floating nuclear power plant. NMZ produced the nuclear power plants KLT-40S for it.
 Surface-to-air missile systems, anti-aircraft weapons, anti-ballistic missile systems and radars
 Artillery
 NMZ Production, a team who makes short films.

References

External links 
 

1932 establishments in Russia
Defence companies of the Soviet Union
Nuclear technology in the Soviet Union
Nuclear technology companies of Russia
Almaz-Antey
Manufacturing companies based in Nizhniy Novgorod
Manufacturing companies established in 1932
Companies formerly listed on the Moscow Exchange